ATA Spec 100 and iSpec 2200 are information standards for aviation maintenance and flight operations published by Airlines for America (formerly Air Transport Association).

These standards provide recommended specifications for the content, structure and deliverables to meet communication requirements [physical, electronic and future technology] of aircraft product technical information.

Current iSpec 2200 comprises a suite of data specifications and data modules for the digital representation and exchange of technical data.

Objective is to:
 Minimize cost and effort expended by operators and OEMs
 Improve information quality and timeliness
 Ensure that manufacturers provide data that meets airline operational needs

History
ATA Spec 100 was originally published in 1956. It established an industry-wide numbering scheme to organize aviation technical documentation as well as content and formatting guidelines for its conventional printed distribution.

ATA Spec 2100 focused on electronic data exchange implemented in SGML.

iSpec 2200 was first published in 2000. It incorporates the previous 100 and 2100 specs which won't be maintained beyond their final 1999 revisions.

References

Aircraft maintenance